Katihar Engineering College is a government engineering college affiliated with Aryabhatta Knowledge University, Patna, India. It is managed by the Department of Science and Technology, Bihar.

History 
The college was established in 2016. It is situated at Katihar district.

Admission 
Admission in the Bachelor's in Technology course is made through UGEAC, conducted by Bihar Combined Entrance Competitive Examination Board.

Departments 
 Civil Engineering
 Mechanical Engineering
 Computer Science and Engineering
  Electrical and Electronic engineering
 Food Processing Engineering

References

External links 
 Official website
 BCECE Board website
 Aryabhatta Knowledge University website
 DST, Bihar website

Engineering colleges in Bihar
Colleges affiliated to Aryabhatta Knowledge University
2016 establishments in Bihar
Educational institutions established in 2016